Woodway station was a station on the New Canaan Branch of the former New York, New Haven, and Hartford Railroad and later the Penn Central. The station was located off of Hoyt Street in Darien, Connecticut. Woodway station closed on July 17, 1972.

History

The station appears on station lists as early as 1919. The station was likely named and established for the nearby Woodway Country Club in Darien, which opened in 1916. The station was closed and consolidated with the Talmadge Hill station on July 17, 1972. All station structures were removed afterwards.

Station layout

The station had a three-sided lean-to style wooden shelter with a low level side platform with a wooden fence that surrounded two sides of the platform. None of the station structures are extant. The station was served by one track from the New Canaan Branch. The station had access from a dirt trail that led from Hoyt Street. The station also had an unpaved parking lot on the east side of the tracks, which was accessible via an unpaved road.

References

External links
 Google Street View of former site of Woodway station

1972 disestablishments in Connecticut
Stations along New York, New Haven and Hartford Railroad lines
Railway stations closed in 1972
Railroad stations in Fairfield County, Connecticut
Former railway stations in Connecticut
Buildings and structures in Darien, Connecticut
1918 establishments in Connecticut